Tang Jialin (born 5 November 1991) is a Chinese biathlete. She competed at the Biathlon World Championships 2011, 2012 and 2013. She competed at the 2014 Winter Olympics in Sochi, in sprint, pursuit and individual.

References

External links
 International Biathlon Union: Tang Jialin
 Sports-Reference: Tang Jialin
 Athlete Biography at FIS International Ski Federation

1991 births
Living people
Biathletes at the 2014 Winter Olympics
Biathletes at the 2018 Winter Olympics
Biathletes at the 2022 Winter Olympics
Chinese female biathletes
Olympic biathletes of China
Asian Games medalists in biathlon
Biathletes at the 2011 Asian Winter Games
Asian Games silver medalists for China
Medalists at the 2011 Asian Winter Games
Biathletes at the 2017 Asian Winter Games
People from Baishan
Sport shooters from Jilin
Skiers from Jilin
21st-century Chinese women